The Wellington Heritage Multiple Unit Preservation Trust (WHMUPT) was formed to preserved D 2130, DM 556 and D 2411 or otherwise known as the "Cyclops" EMU set. The trust is based at Maymorn near the Rimutaka Incline Railway Heritage Trust (RIRHT). The set was purchased in January 2013 and arrived at their base on 21 April the same year. One trailer from this unit has been used as a passenger carriage by the RIRHT for their operational running days, and is stored undercover. Minimal conservation work has been done to the rest of the set which is stored outside.

In June 2018, the group purchased a Ganz-Mavag EMU from Greater Wellington Regional Council for the symbolic price of $1. The unit had been sold to an overseas buyer previously, but the deal had fallen through and was in the process of being disposed of by burial when the deal was reached to preserve the unit. The unit has been stored in Wellington Railway yard awaiting a move to Maymorn to join Cyclops, with some graffiti removal work undertaken on the unit.

In February 2022, the Ganz Mavag unit was moved from Wellington yard where it was stored to Hutt Workshops for further storage. The Rail Heritage Trust of New Zealand (RHT) described the unit as having been abandoned by the WHMUPT, and that they were assuming the role of finding it a home. The RHT said the unit would be moving to Maymorn still, but its new caretakers would be the Rimutaka Incline Railway Heritage Trust (RIRHT) instead and that the move to Hutt Workshops was for a limited time while RHT funded the move to Maymorn. The RHT indicated that the WHMUPT was essentially defunct. It is not known at present whether the RIRHT are also to be come the new owners of the Cyclops unit as well.

References

External links 
 New Zealand Rolling Stock Register
 NZR Rolling Stock Lists
 NZR Locomotives

 

Heritage railways in New Zealand
Railway museums in New Zealand